During the 1998–99 English football season, West Bromwich Albion competed in the Football League First Division.

Season summary
In the 1998–99 season, local lad and lifetime fan Lee Hughes scored 31 times in the league to finish as top goalscorer in all four English divisions, but the Baggies finished only 12th and Smith was sacked in the summer of 1999.

Final league table

Results
West Bromwich Albion's score comes first

Legend

Football League First Division

FA Cup

League Cup

First-team squad
Squad at end of season

Notes

References

West Bromwich Albion F.C. seasons
West Bromwich Albion